Coleophora hernia is a moth of the family Coleophoridae. It is found in Turkey.

Larvae have been reared on Herniaria incana.

References

hernia
Endemic fauna of Turkey
Moths described in 2001
Moths of Asia